Our Lady Immaculate & St Robert's Catholic Church, Harrogate is a parish church in the Roman Catholic Church located in Harrogate. It is a Grade II listed building.

History 
The presbytery dates from 1864. The church dates from 1873 by George Goldie and Charles Edwin Child. The church was opened by Cardinal Henry Edward Manning on 5 June 1873.

The Lady Chapel was added in 1906 by Marten of Leeds. It is built in the Gothic Revival style. The church was consecrated in 1930.

Organ 
An organ by William Hill was installed in 1899. A specification of that organ can be found on the National Pipe Organ Register.

References 

Saint Robert
Roman Catholic Diocese of Leeds
Grade II listed churches in North Yorkshire
Roman Catholic churches in North Yorkshire
Roman Catholic churches completed in 1873
Grade II listed Roman Catholic churches in England
George Goldie church buildings
Religious organizations established in 1864
19th-century Roman Catholic church buildings in the United Kingdom